R301 may refer to:
 R301 (Morocco)
 R301 road (South Africa)